Omega is an unincorporated community in Kingfisher County, Oklahoma, United States. The ZIP Code is 73764.

Education
Chisholm Trail Technology Center is located in Omega.

References

Unincorporated communities in Kingfisher County, Oklahoma
Unincorporated communities in Oklahoma